Here There Be Monsters may refer to:

"Here There Be Monsters", an episode of The Dead Zone
Here There Be Monsters, a Doctor Who audio play

See also 
 Here be dragons